USS Yankee has been the name of two ships in the United States Navy.
 , a steam-powered sidewheel tugboat in commission from 1861 to 1865
 , an auxiliary cruiser and transport used in the Spanish–American War and in commission from 1898 to 1899, from 1903 to 1906, and in 1908

See also
 

United States Navy ship names